James Anthony Carlen III (July 11, 1933 – July 22, 2012) was an American football player, coach, and college athletics administrator.  He served as the head football coach at West Virginia University (1966–1969) and Texas Tech University (1970–1974). He served as both the head football coach and athletic director of the University of South Carolina (1975–1981).  Carlen compiled an overall career college football record of 107–69–6.

Coaching career
Carlen coached the West Virginia Mountaineers from 1966 to 1969 with a record of 25–13–3 (.658).  Then he coached the Texas Tech Red Raiders from 1970 to 1974, where he amassed a 37–20–2 record. From 1975 to 1981, he was the head football coach of the South Carolina Gamecocks where he coached Heisman Trophy running back George Rogers and compiled a 45–36–1 record.  Carlen 45 wins are third most in the program's history after Steve Spurrier's 86 and Rex Enright's 64. In 1979 and 1980, Carlen led the Gamecocks to consecutive 8–4 campaigns with appearances in the Hall of Fame Classic and Gator Bowl.  His career bowl game record is 2–5–1.

In July 2008, four years before his death, Carlen was inducted into the Texas Tech Athletics Hall of Honor.

Coach Carlen was actively involved in the Fellowship of Christian Athletes (FCA) during his entire post-coaching life. In April 2011 he was quoted as saying, “I was one of the original six members of the FCA, the originals. FCA started very small, and then it snowballed. When I hired a coach I always took a close look at his spiritual life,” Carlen said. “When you have God on your side you don’t have to worry.”

Death

Carlen died on July 22, 2012, at the age of seventy-nine at a nursing home near his home at Hilton Head Island in Beaufort County in southeastern South Carolina. A memorial service was scheduled for Friday, July 27, at 4 p.m. at the Trenholm Road United Methodist Church in Columbia, South Carolina.

Head coaching record

References

1933 births
2012 deaths
American football linebackers
American football punters
Georgia Tech Yellow Jackets football coaches
Georgia Tech Yellow Jackets football players
South Carolina Gamecocks athletic directors
South Carolina Gamecocks football coaches
Texas Tech Red Raiders football coaches
West Virginia Mountaineers football coaches
People from Hilton Head, South Carolina
Players of American football from Tennessee
People from Cookeville, Tennessee
Deaths from Alzheimer's disease
American United Methodists
20th-century Methodists
Deaths from dementia in South Carolina